Ken Flach and Rick Leach were the defending champions, but competed this year with different partners. Flach teamed up with Brian Devening and lost in the second round to tournament runners-up Sébastien Lareau and Patrick McEnroe, while Leach teamed up with David Pate and lost in the first round to Kelly Jones and Mark Keil.

Henrik Holm and Anders Järryd won the title by defeating Sébastien Lareau and Patrick McEnroe 7–6, 6–1 in the final.

Seeds
The top four seeds received a bye into the second round.

Draw

Finals

Top half

Bottom half

References

External links
 Official results archive (ATP)
 Official results archive (ITF)

1994 Japan Open Tennis Championships